DJ's a Creative Unit is an Indian production company founded by Deeya Singh and Tony Singh. It has produced successful shows like Just Mohabbat, Left Right Left, Jassi Jaissi Koi Nahin, Parvarrish – Kuchh Khattee Kuchh Meethi and Shaurya Aur Anokhi Ki Kahani.

Current Productions

Past productions

References

Companies based in Mumbai
Television production companies of India
Entertainment companies of India
1993 establishments in Maharashtra
Indian companies established in 1993
Entertainment companies established in 1993